This is a list of national swimming records for The Bahamas. These are the fastest times ever swum by a Bahamian swimmer which are recognised and ratified by Bahamas Aquatics.

All records were set in finals unless noted otherwise.

Long Course (50 m)

Men

Women

Mixed relay

Short Course (25 m)

Men

Women

References
General
Bahamian Long Course Records – Men 30 June 2021 updated
Bahamian Long Course Records – Women 30 June 2021 updated
Bahamian Short Course Records 7 March 2021 updated
Specific

External links
Bahamas Aquatics web site

Bahamas
Records
Swimming records
Swimming